Mount Samsel is a mountain along the north side of Clifford Glacier, just west of the juncture of the Kubitza Glacier, in Palmer Land in the Antarctic peninsula. Mapped by United States Geological Survey (USGS) in 1974. Named by Advisory Committee on Antarctic Names (US-ACAN) for Gene L. Samsel, United States Antarctic Research Program (USARP) biologist at Palmer Station in the 1969-70 and 1970-71 seasons.

References
 

Mountains of Palmer Land